Soan papdi (also known as san papri, shompapri, sohan papdi, shonpapdi or patisa) is a popular dessert in the Indian subcontinent. The term sohan is of Persian origin. It bears some resemblance to the Persian sohan pashmaki, which gave rise to the Turkish pişmaniye. It is usually cube-shaped or served as flakes, and has a crisp and flaky texture. Traditionally sold loose in rolled paper cones, modern industrial production has led it to being sold in the form of tightly formed cubes.

Ingredients
Its main ingredients are sugar, gram flour, flour, ghee, almond, milk, and cardamom.

See also
Sohan (confectionery)
Sohan halwa
Pişmaniye, a similar Turkish dessert
Pashmak, a similar Iranian dessert

References

External links

 Annotated video recipe illustrates traditional hand-made technique for creating Soan Papdi's crisp multi-layers (filmed at Shreya's Sweets Hampankatta, Mangalore); ·Permaculturetravel· YouTube Channel 
 Demonstration of modern mechanized equipment in the making of pişmaniye, a related Turkish confection

Indian desserts
Pakistani desserts
Cookies
Chickpea dishes